Barrett Gibson Lyon (born March 18, 1978) is an American Internet entrepreneur.

Early life and education
The son of a lawyer, Lyon was raised in Auburn, California. Although he initially struggled in school due to dyslexia, in middle school he became fascinated with computers. He soon found that the methods he used to overcome dyslexia allowed him to quickly gain an expert knowledge of computers. While in high school, he set up Linux servers to host webpages for friends and also managed his school's computer network. In 1995, while investigating a possible vulnerability in Network Solutions he accidentally caused AOL's website to go down for three days. After high school, Lyon enrolled at California State University, Sacramento and studied philosophy and photography. He has a wife named Simone Lyon and a daughter named Isabella Lyon.

Opte Project
Lyon is the creator of the Opte Project, which is an Internet mapping project that seeks to make an accurate representation of the extent of the Internet using visual graphics.  The project was started in October 2003 in an effort to provide a useful Internet map with open source code. The project has gathered support worldwide and is part of the catalogs of the Boston Museum of Science and The Museum of Modern Art.

Prolexic
While working part-time in college for a small network security company, Lyon worked on defending websites against Denial of Service attacks. He soon decided to start Prolexic Technologies to specifically focus on defending websites against such attacks. His initial customers were online casinos which were facing extortionist threats from operators of Denial of Service attacks. After helping bring a Russian hacker to justice, Lyon's publicity allowed him to gain many new clients from outside of the gambling industry. He soon began giving talks about botnets and DoS attacks at industry meetings. Lyon eventually left Prolexic to start BitGravity. Prolexic was later sold to Akamai Technologies, a Content Delivery Network based in the Boston for $370 million.

DoS investigation
Lyon has been called a hero for his work tracking Russian denial of service attack extortion groups.  His work has been featured around the globe and is featured in the book Fatal System Error.   He provided details and helped coordinate with multinational law enforcement groups which resulted in the capture of Ivan Maksakov, Alexander Petrov, and Denis Stepanov.  The three men were at the heart of an extortion ring which was extorting money from banks, Internet casinos, and other web based businesses.  Reported damages caused by Maksakov, Petrov, and Stenanov range in the tens of millions of dollars.  On October 8, 2007, Maksakov, Petrov, Stenanov were found guilty and sentenced to eight years in prison in the Russian Federation with a 100,000 ruble penalty.

Business interests
After leaving Prolexic, Lyon co-founded of BitGravity, a content delivery network and served as its chief technology officer. BitGravity focuses on providing content delivery for rich media sources. While at BitGravity, to lessen billing confusion regarding the definition of a GigaByte, Lyon defined an accepted billing amount, coined as the BarretByte.
Lyon left BitGravity in June 2009.  BitGravity was acquired in January 2011 by Tata Communications.

In 2009 with funding from Jay Adelson and Kevin Rose, he founded  XDN. XDN's first products provide businesses with greater control over existing Content Delivery Networks by allowing them to use CDN's based on factors like price and service. In November 2012, XDN was acquired by Fortinet.

Lyon then founded Defense.Net in December 2012 to build a DDoS defense network for the modern Internet. In 2014, the company was named one of the 100 Hottest Private Companies in North America by Red Herring and acquired shortly after by F5 Networks purportedly for between $50 and $100 million.

Lyon formerly worked as Head of Security Research and Development for Neustar.  He has operated a Laser Production company along with designing camping equipment for Alien Buffalo. Recently he announced a new venture Netography and currently serves as Chief Architect, with seed funding from Andreesson Horowitz and Mango Capital.

See also 
Opte Project
Fatal System Error
Prolexic
Denial of service attack
MoMA
Network mapping
Defense.Net
Netography

References

External links 
Barrett Lyon's web site
Xchange Delivery Network
BitGravity, Inc.
Demo God Awards Introduction of Bitgravity
Lyon interview with Revision3
Scobleizer TV video interview of Barrett Lyon
Radio interview on NPR's Fresh Air
Lyon Launched Defense.Net

1978 births
Living people
American technology chief executives
American chief technology officers
People from Auburn, California